Owen Sound (Cook Field) Aerodrome  is located  east of Owen Sound, Ontario, Canada.

References

Registered aerodromes in Ontario
Owen Sound